Geir Ludvig Aasen Ouren (born 26 August 1974) is a Norwegian cross-country skier who has competed since 1999. His best World Cup finish was fifth on four occasions between 2004 and 2009.

Cross-country skiing results
All results are sourced from the International Ski Federation (FIS).

World Cup

Season standings

References

External links

1974 births
Living people
Norwegian male cross-country skiers
Sportspeople from Kristiansand